Edmond Lemaigre (1849 in Clermont-Ferrand – 22 May 1890 in the 8th arrondissement of Paris) was a 19th-century French organist, conductor and composer.

Biography 
Lemaire began his musical studies in his hometown with Charles Renaud de Vilbac (1829–1884).

In 1872, he continued his studies of writing in Paris with Charles-Joseph Vervoitte (1822–1884), Kapellmeister and organist of the Saint-Roch church, and pipe organ with Édouard Batiste.

In 1877 he became the first holder of the new organ (1876/77) of the cathedral of Clermont-Ferrand, inaugurated on May 26, 1877, a position he held until 1888, when he moved to Paris. Aloÿs Claussmann succeeded him at the pulpit.

The organist of the Concerts of the Trocadéro in Paris, Lemaigre played there several of his compositions on the new organ Cavaillé-Coll (1878) of the grand hall.

He succeeded his father at the head of the "Société Lyrique" in 1881, and in 1883 he founded the "Association Artistique du Centre" at Clermont-Ferrand.

Works for organ 
 Twelve pieces for organ, Paris, Leduc (v. 1881, 1909): 1. Marche Solennelle in D flat major – 2. Méditation in A flat major – 3. Pastorale in D major – 4. Alla Fuga in C major – 5. Élégie in C minor – 6. Capriccio in F major – 7. Andante Religioso in G major – 8. Mélodie in E flat major – 9. Prière in G flat major – 10. Deux Préludes (I in E major, II in A minor) – 11. En forme de Canon in F major – 12. Scherzo in G major.
 New Pieces for organ, in 6 notebooks, Paris, Costallat, w. d. (ca 1900).
1st Cahier: 1. Fragment symphonique (alla polacca) in G minor for organ or orchestra – 2. Andantino in A flat major
2nd Cahier: 1. Intermezzo in G flat major – 2. Cantabile in B flat major – 3. Prélude in C minor.
3rd Cahier: 1. Magnificat in F major – 2. Magnificat in D minor.
4th Cahier: 1. Offertoire from the Messia by Hændel in D minor/major – 2. Contemplation in G major – 3. Prélude in F major.
5th Cahier: 1. Stabat Mater (15 variations) in B flat major – 2. Canzona pastorale in A minor.
6th Cahier: 1. Élégie-Marche in C minor – 2. Élévation in E flat major – 3. Kyrie of the Messe royale by Dumont – 4. 5 Versets in D minor/F major.

References

External links 
 France Orgue Discography by Alain Cartayrade.
 Orgues en France Les orgues de la cathédrale de Clermont-Ferrand.
 YouTube Pastor de Lasala joue le Prélude en mi majeur et le Capriccio en fa majeur des Douze Pièces pour orgue de 1909, sur le petit orgue George Fincham (1962) de la Chapel of the Good Shepherd, Ashfield, Sydney (Australie).
 YouTube Marche Solennelle en ré bémol, no 1° des Douze Pièces pour orgue, par François Clément à l’orgue Merklin restauré de la cathédrale de Clermont-Ferrand.
 
 Modern reprints at Chanvrelin.

1849 births
1890 deaths
French classical organists
French male organists
Musicians from Clermont-Ferrand
French conductors (music)
French male conductors (music)
19th-century French composers
Composers for pipe organ
19th-century French male musicians
Male classical organists
19th-century organists